The list of ship commissionings in 1988 includes a chronological list of all ships commissioned in 1988.


See also 

1988
 Ship commissionings